is an eccentric trans-Neptunian object with a centaur-like orbit from the outer Solar System, approximately 150 kilometers in diameter. It was discovered on 21 July 1999, by astronomers John Kavelaars, Brett Gladman, Matthew Holman and Jean-Marc Petit at Mauna Kea Observatories, Hawaii, United States.

Orbit and classification 

 orbits the Sun at a distance of 17.6–46.6 AU once every 181 years and 9 months (66,375 days). Its orbit has an eccentricity of 0.45 and an inclination of 3° with respect to the ecliptic. The body's observation arc begins with its official discovery observation at Mauna Kea in 1999.

Neptune has a semi-major axis of 30 AU and  has a semi-major axis of 32 AU. The Minor Planet Center (MPC) does not classify this object as a centaur because the MPC defines centaurs as having a semi-major axis of less than 30.066 AU.  crosses the orbits of both Neptune and Uranus and has an inclination of only 2.62°. The Deep Ecliptic Survey (DES) defines centaurs using a dynamical classification scheme, based on the behavior of orbital integrations over 10 million years. The DES defines centaurs as nonresonant objects whose osculating perihelia are less than the osculating semimajor axis of Neptune at any time during the integration. Using the dynamical definition of a centaur,  is a centaur.

Physical characteristics 

Lightcurve analysis gave a rotation period of 9.26 hours with a brightness amplitude of 0.11 magnitude. The period, however, is ambiguous with alternative solutions (13.4 and 15.45 hours).

Numbering and naming 

This minor planet was numbered by the Minor Planet Center on 22 August 2002. As of 2018, it has not been named.

Notes

References

External links 
 Asteroid Lightcurve Database (LCDB), query form (info )
 Dictionary of Minor Planet Names, Google books
 Asteroids and comets rotation curves, CdR – Observatoire de Genève, Raoul Behrend
 Discovery Circumstances: Numbered Minor Planets (40001)-(45000) – Minor Planet Center
 
 

044594
044594
Discoveries by John J. Kavelaars
Discoveries by Brett J. Gladman
Discoveries by Matthew J. Holman
Discoveries by Jean-Marc Petit
19990721